Drillia connelli is a species of sea snail, a marine gastropod mollusk in the family Drilliidae.

Description

Distribution
This marine species occurs off Zululand, South Africa.

References

 Kilburn, R.N., 1988. Turridae (Mollusca: Gastropoda) of southern Africa and Mozambique, Part 4 Drilliinae, Crassispirinae and Strictispirinae. . Ann. Natal Mus., 29(1):167–320

Endemic fauna of South Africa
connelli
Gastropods described in 1988